Kanni Maadam is a 2020 Indian Tamil-language romantic drama film directed by Bose Venkat in his directorial debut. The film stars newcomers Sriram Karthik, Chaya Devi, and Vishnu. The film received mixed to positive reviews from critics.

Cast 

 Sriram Karthik as Anbu
 Chaya Devi as Malar
 Aadukalam Murugadoss as Shankar
 Vishnu Ramasamy as Kathir
 Mime Gopi as Inspector Paramasivam
 Valeena Princes as Auto Driver
 Priyanka Robo Shankar as Landlady
 Gajaraj as Anbu's father
Ananthraj

Production 
Principal photography commenced on 18 February 2019 and ended on 16 May 2019.

Soundtrack 
Several celebrities attended the audio launch including Vijay Sethupathi, Bharath, Samuthirakani, Vikraman, Harish Kalyan, Gayathrie.

Newcomer Hari Sai composed the film's songs. Robo Shankar made his singing debut in the film.

"Oyadha Megam" – Shweta Mohan
"Moonu Kaalu Vaaganam" – Robo Shankar
"Oru Veedu" – Vijay Yesudas
"Andarathil Thongudhaiya" – Anthony Daasan
"Thee Pidithu" – Arvind Mukundan, Priyanka NK
"Yen Devan" – Sirisha
"Villu Paatu" – Hari Sai

Release and reception 
Kaani Maadam was released on 21 February 2020. The Times of India gave the film two out of five stars and wrote that "However, it is the overdose of melodrama which lets the film down. The lacklustre screenplay doesn’t engage after a point". Similarly, The Deccan Chronicle gave the film two-and-a-half out of five stars and stated that " Had the director concentrated on a better screenplay, the film would have had a bigger impact" while praising the performances of the cast.

Accolades 

Screening Chennai International Film festival 2020
Osaka International Film Festival Japan screening
2020 Tamil Best Film screening Chennai Film Festival 2020 along with 11 films

References

External links 

2020 directorial debut films
2020 films
2020 romantic drama films
Indian romantic drama films